Thomas M. Ryan is an American businessperson. He served as the president and chief executive officer of CVS/Caremark Corporation from 1998 to 2011.

Biography

Early life
He received a degree in Pharmacy from the University of Rhode Island.

Career
He began working for CVS in 1978 as an in-store pharmacist. He served as its CEO from 1998 to 2011. While CEO of CVS Caremark in 2009, he earned a total compensation of $16,231,292, which included a base salary of $1,400,000, a cash bonus of $3,512,526, stocks granted of $6,425,007, and options granted of $4,625,000.

He has sat on the boards of the Melville Corporation, Ryanair, TriCon Global Restaurants, Reebok, FleetBoston Financial, the Citizens Bank Of Rhode Island. He now serves on the board of directors of Bank of America, Yum! Brands, Five Below, Vantiv. He is an operating partner of Advent International.

Philanthropy
He sits on the board of trustees of his alma mater, the University of Rhode Island. The 7,657-seat Ryan Center arena on the campus of the University of Rhode Island is named for Ryan, who was the arena's principal donor. In November 2013, Ryan and his wife Cathy donated $15 million to URI, establishing the George & Anne Ryan Institute for Neuroscience. The Ryan Institute focuses on research, translational medicine, and community outreach related to neurodegenerative diseases such as Alzheimer's disease and Parkinson's disease. It complements the university's Interdisciplinary Neuroscience Program (INP), which includes M.S., Ph.D., and Certificate degree programs in Neuroscience as well as an undergraduate program.

References

Living people
University of Rhode Island alumni
American retail chief executives
Directors of Bank of America
20th-century American businesspeople
21st-century American businesspeople
American pharmacists
American corporate directors
Year of birth missing (living people)